Adéolú is a Yoruba name and surname meaning "the crown or royalty of the Lord". It may refer to:

 Adéolú, mononym of Ade Olufeko, Nigerian-American designer and entrepreneur
 Adeolu Akande, Nigerian political scientist
 Funsho Adeolu, Nigerian actor and producer